Jilla is a 2014 Indian Tamil-language action drama film written and directed by R. T. Neason and produced by R. B. Choudary through the company Super Good Films. Starring Mohanlal and Vijay athe film revolves around the conflict between  crime boss and his adopted son, a police officer whose life and approach towards law change after a violent incident. The film co-stars Kajal Aggarwal, Soori, Mahat, Nivetha Thomas, Sampath Raj and Pradeep Rawat. The film features soundtrack composed by D. Imman, with Ganesh Rajavelu and Don Max handling cinematography and editing respectively.

The film released on 10 January 2014 and received generally positive reviews from critics. Jilla completed a 100-day theatrical run on 19 April 2014. The film had earned 85 crore in its entire run at the box office. The film was a commercial success. It was also screened in Japan in 2020.

Plot 
Shakthi is the adopted son of a Madurai-based crime boss, Sivan and is also his right-hand man, bodyguard and driver. Sivan lives happily with Shakthi, his wife, his son and daughter Vignesh and Mahalaskhmi. Shakthi hates the police due to a police officer killing his father, who was Sivan's driver, in his childhood. His hatred is such that he hates the khaki colour (which is worn by policemen in India), constantly teases his friend Gopal, who gets selected as a constable, and even loses romantic interest on a woman named Shanthi after he finds out that she is an Inspector.

When Sivan is insulted by Ajay Rathore, a newly appointed police commissioner of Madurai, he forces Shakthi to become an IPS officer to save his crime syndicate and prove the commissioner's words wrong. Reluctantly taking charge as ACP of Madurai City East, Shakthi gives free rein to Sivan and his henchmen, who wreak havoc over Madurai, until one of their activities inadvertently causes a gas leak which destroys a school and some nearby buildings, killing several people, including women and children. The incident, along with the assault of a woman by Sivan's henchmen when she had come to the police station to lodge a complaint against Sivan for killing her husband, causes Shakthi to take up the path of an honest and upright police officer. 

Shakti thrashes Sivan's henchmen who assaulted the woman. Shakthi's new persona is not liked by Sivan and after a heated argument between the two, he disowns Shakthi. A cat-and-mouse game then begins between Sivan and Shakthi, with Sivan and his henchmen, determined to humiliate Shakthi at every opportunity, while Shakthi, assisted by Shanthi and Gopal, tries to rid Sivan's influence in Madurai. Shakthi is soon promoted to the rank of DCP for his efforts. Later, Shakthi finds out that Sivan's other adopted son, a minister Aadhi Kesavan is plotting to kill Sivan in revenge for Sivan killing his police officer father (the same police officer who killed Shakthi's father) in his childhood. 

Since Shakthi had inadvertently thwarted his earlier plans to kill Sivan, he also plans to get Shakthi killed at the hands of Sivan by killing Sivan's son Vignesh and putting the blame on Shakthi for Vignesh's death. Unfortunately for Aadhi, Sivan learns about his plan and reconciles with Shakti, where they fight Aadhi's henchmen and Aadhi. Shakthi beats up Aadhi and gives him to Sivan to kill. Sivan gives Aadhi a choice to kill himself. Aadhi takes up the choice and slits his throat thereby killing him. Shakthi reluctantly arrests a reformed Sivan for his misdeeds, on Sivan's request.

Cast

Special appearances

Production

Casting 
Upon the completion of Velayudham (2011), Vijay announced his next project to be with Nesan, who had worked in Velayudham as an assistant to director Jayam Raja. The project however commenced only two years later, after Vijay completed three other films. Neason described Jilla as a "Madurai-based movie" and also revealed that right from 2009, he had this story line about two powerful characters and their emotional interaction, making it his second directorial after Muruga (2007). Vijay who had several collaborations with R. B. Choudary decided to produce the film. Vairamuthu was chosen to pen the lyrics for a song in Jilla, who would be writing a song for a Vijay-starrer after 12 years. Mohanlal liked the script and accepted the film. Raju Sundaram will be choreographing the dance sequences in the film.

Nisha Agarwal was rumored to be performing in the film, but she denied these rumors on Twitter, stating that she had not been approached for a film role. Kajal Aggarwal and Poornima Bhagyaraj were also slated to perform in the film. Gautam Kurup was signed up as the second antagonist. Niveda Thomas said that she would be playing the daughter of Mohanlal's character and sister of Vijay's character. Due to clash of dates, cinematographer Natarajan Subramaniam was replaced by R. Ganesh. During a photoshoot with the main cast, Nesan announced that filming would take place in Madurai, Chennai and Andhra Pradesh, while songs would be filmed overseas.

Filming 
The opening ceremony for the film was held on 11 March 2013 at R. B. Choudary's Chennai office. The first schedule of film shooting took off on 13 May in Madurai and Karaikudi with Mohanlal and Poornima Bhagyaraj. Vijay was reported to join by the end of the month, but this didn't materialise. For the next schedule the film crew shifted to a Chennai-based studio where large sets resembling the city of Madurai were built up for the film. In September 2013, it was reported that Vijay and Kajal Aggarwal would be playing police officers in the film.

The fourth schedule of the film was supposed to start on 14 August. However, the shooting got cancelled due to heavy rain. In October it was reported that 80% of the film had been completed with only the song sequences remaining.

Soundtrack

Release 
Jilla was released on 9 January 2014 in France, Singapore and Canada, and worldwide on 10 January 2014.

Critical reception 
Jilla received generally positive reviews from critics and audience who praised the cast performances (particularly Mohanlal and Vijay), background score and action sequences, while the length was criticized and consequently trimmed by ten minutes. 

Sify stated that the film is a "Mass Masala Entertainer" and wrote, "Jilla is masala entertainment and a full course meal that leaves you with a smile on your face", calling it "a perfect outing with your family this festival season and rated 4/5". The Times of India gave 3.5 stars out of 5 and stated "As far as commercial films are concerned, Jilla is definitely assured filmmaking", while adding, "the main issue with Jilla is that it is overlong. Neason, probably in an effort to make it a wholesome entertainer, keeps packing in scenes oblivious to the running time. Ananda Vikatan rated the film 41 out of 100.

Indiaglitz gave 3.25/5 and stated that the film is racy and pure family entertainer and movie entertains all audience". Behindwoods gave 2.75 out of 5 and stated, "The charismatic screen presence of Vijay and Mohanlal, enjoyable musical tracks and comedy scenes and power packed action sequences marks Jilla that satisfies audience. Bangalore Mirror gave 3.5 out of 5 and called it "a perfect festival film that has all the trappings of a blockbuster"

International Business Times gave 4/5 and stated Vijay's and Mohanlal's performances makes the movie entertaining to the audience. Gautaman Bhaskaran of Hindustan Times gave the film 3/5 stars and stated, "Vijay and Mohanlal captivating style and powerful performance makes the movie a solid family entertainer". S Saraswathi of Rediff gave 3.5/5 and wrote, "Vijay and Mohanlal  easily keep the audience entertained with their powerful performances, both equally confident and secure in their own ability, undoubtedly making the film a solid commercial entertainer for the masses."

Box office 
IB Times stated it opened well in Kerala too. It grossed around  worldwide on its opening day and  worldwide in its extended five-day weekend. In Chennai city alone, the film netted in the first week with an average theater occupancy of 97% and stood first for the weekend. After 8 weeks at the Chennai box office, the film netted around 

Jilla released at 44 screens in UK. The film collected   Jilla has grossed £4,815 from five screens in its third weekend at the UK box office. It had a collection of £243,029 in 17 days. In Australia. The film has grossed a total of A$43,899  in 17 days at the Australian box office. Jilla opened at Number 2 in Malaysian Box Office and was released in 69 screens.  Jilla has made  from 36 screens in the first weekend.

Remake plans 
In a meeting with his fans' association at Srikakulam in January 2014, Chiranjeevi announced that he wants V. V. Vinayak to direct the remake of Jilla (2014) starring himself and his son Ram Charan after the 2014 Indian general elections. It was supposed to be Chiranjeevi's 150th film as an actor. Chiranjeevi opted to choose a script that would reflect the sentiments of Telugu people and walked out from the remake. Charan felt uncomfortable to reprise a role where he has to oppose his father and being dissatisfied with the story, he dropped the remake's proposal.

In late March 2014, R. T. Neason, the director of the original, wanted to direct the Telugu remake bankrolled by Super Good Films. Neason wanted Nandamuri Balakrishna and N. T. Rama Rao Jr. to reprise the roles played by Mohanlal and Vijay in the original respectively. Its possibility was doubtful because of the strained relationship between Balakrishna and Rama Rao Jr. in the past few years. After the release of Gopala Gopala (2015), its co-producer Sharat Marar acquired the remake rights of Jilla and approached Daggubati Venkatesh and Ravi Teja with the proposal of its remake to be directed by Veeru Potla.

In the past, Potla approached both Venkatesh and Ravi Teja with a storyline in July 2014 which upon their consent was developed into a script, which remained in scripting stage according to Ravi Teja as of late September 2014. Kona Venkat was reported to pen the remake's screenplay. Ravi Teja evinced interest to be a part of the remake and the film's production was expected to begin in April 2015. However, there were reports stating that Jilla would be dubbed into Telugu with a duration of 140 minutes including a separate comedy track on Brahmanandam with Vijay. Also, Rama Rao Jr.'s elder brother Nandamuri Kalyan Ram planned to remake Jilla in Telugu with Balakrishna after arranging a special screening for the latter.

The Telugu dubbed version was confirmed in mid April 2015. Tamatam Kumar Reddy and Prasad Sannidhi of Sri Obuleswara Productions acquired the Telugu dubbing rights while R. B. Chowdary was announced to present the film. A separate track shot was shot with Vijay and Brahmanandam. Shashank Vennelakanti penned the dialogues for the Telugu dubbed version. After considering many other titles, Jilla was retained for the Telugu dubbed version.

The film was remade in Odia as Bajrangi (2017).

References

External links 
 

2014 action drama films
2010s Tamil-language films
2014 films
Fictional portrayals of the Tamil Nadu Police
Films scored by D. Imman
Films shot in Madurai
Films shot in Osaka
Indian action drama films
Indian films about revenge
2014 masala films
Tamil films remade in other languages
Films shot in Kyoto Prefecture
Films shot in Kyoto
Super Good Films films